Khumba is a 2013 South African computer-animated comedy film directed and co-produced by Anthony Silverston and written by Silverston and Raffaella Delle Donne. The film stars the voices of Jake T. Austin, Steve Buscemi, Loretta Devine, Laurence Fishburne, Richard E. Grant, AnnaSophia Robb, 
Anika Noni Rose, Catherine Tate, Ben Vereen, and Liam Neeson. It is the second movie made by Triggerfish Animation Studios and is distributed by Millennium Entertainment in the US. The International distribution rights are being licensed by Cinema Management Group. The film is about Khumba, a zebra who is half-striped like a quagga and blamed for the lack of rain by the rest of his insular, abusive, superstitious herd, except his dad, mom and Tombi. He embarks on a quest to earn his stripes.

The film was dedicated in memory of The Quagga Breeding Project founder Reinhold Rau, who died on 11 February 2006. Rau was known for efforts to use selective-breeding to recreate the extinct quagga, a close relative of the plains zebra. The film premiered at the TIFF on 8 September 2013, and was released on 25 October 2013 by Indigenous Film Distribution. Khumba received mixed reviews from critics and was a box office disappointment, only grossing $28.4 million worldwide against a $20 million budget.

Plot
In South Africa within the Great Karoo, a half-striped zebra named Khumba is born into an insular isolated herd of all-striped zebras where he's raised by his sick mother Lungisa and his father & the herd's leader, Seko. Rumors that the strange foal is cursed spread and before long he is blamed for the drought that sets into the Great Karoo. As he matures, Khumba is picked on and remains ostracized by most of the herd with the exception of Tombi, a young female zebra friend close in age - whom Khumba has a crush on - and uncomfortable in the herd due to her tomboyish manners.

When a mystical African mantis appears to Khumba, he draws a map to what could be interpreted as either water or stripes between it. Khumba jeopardizes the herd and gets into trouble when he attempts to admit several gemsbok into the watering-hole enclosure when their wise elderly healer needs water. A murderous African leopard, Phango, warns Mkhulu that he and the herd can't stay in their enclosure forever. Seko berates and scolds Khumba for putting the herd at risk and for the next week, he'll drink half of his rations. Lungisa tells the story of how a white horse got its stripes by swimming in a magic river and other horses wanted to have stripes like him, making the zebra we know today. Shortly after, Lungisa succumbs to her disease and dies. Then, Khumba leaves the confines of his home knowing that he cannot survive in the herd where it is viewed as only "half-a-zebra".

Khumba ventures beyond the fence and once outside, encounters an opportunistic African wild dog named Skalk who nearly leads him to his doom when Skalk's pack try to eat him, even though he tries persuading his pack not to. He is saved by a maternal wildebeest named Mama V who is a self-confessed free spirit who does not want to be the average stay-at-home mom, like other wildebeest, & had lost her child to Phango. & a flamboyant British ostrich named Bradley who is mothered by Mama V & possesses a histrionic diva-esque attitude. The duo join Khumba on his quest in the hope that their own search for a safe waterhole is over. On their journey, Khumba aids a migrating herd of springbok in opening a hole in a great fence to continue journeying forward. Curiously, the springbok are all so similar that they cannot even differentiate among one another.

Khumba thinks his journey is over when he wanders into a new age, bohemian community living safely within the confines of Ying's National Park. There he meets a colorful group of individuals like a family of Meerkats, an Ground Pangolin, two bushbucks, a bat-eared fox, and an Australian endangered riverine rabbit who has survived extinction by mastering a myriad of skills ranging from impersonations to beat-boxing. After narrowly escaping capture by an opportunistic group of park rangers who tranquilizes Bradley and traps Khumba in a cage, he wanders to a nearby mountain to speak to the mighty Black Eagle under the advice of the riverine rabbit.

Khumba encounters a group of fanatical rock hyraxes who worship the Black Eagle and stymie his advance. From the albino Black Eagle, he learns the way to the watering hole and that it lies in Phango's cave. The Black Eagle also reveals that Phango is obsessed with being whole and murdered his whole clan, as revenge for being rejected when he was a cub, due to the fact he was born with one eye blind, which gave him a sense of smell like no other leopard, which turned him into a powerfully & endlessly killing hunter. Unbeknownst to Khumba, Phango is trailing him because of an ancient predator myth that says consuming the half-striped zebra will make whoever ate it the most powerful hunter that ever lived. As Khumba journeys onwards, Seko becomes withdrawn and is remorseful that he has let his herd down. He would have never been so hard on Khumba if it never happened. With Tombi’s help, he realizes that if he does not lead his herd in search of another waterhole, they will all die and sets out to follow the trail of Phango. He is prompted by evidence that Khumba may be alive.

Tensions between Khumba, Mama V, and Bradley escalate as they move on. While slaking their thirst at a well on an abandoned farm, they are driven away by Nora, a loony, solitary Merino who lost her husband to Phango, and Khumba reveals that the watering hole is in Phango's cave. The trio has an argument and a fall-out and Khumba continues on alone. Lost and delirious in a saltpan, Khumba is rescued by the same gemsbok healer that he tried to help and wanders the remaining distance to the mountain, and Phango's lair. Meanwhile, Phango intercepts Mama V and Bradley and discovers that Khumba is fortuitously heading straight to him and returns to his cave. Concerned for Khumba's safety, Mama V and Bradley decide to intercede and warn him. Meanwhile, determined to find the waterhole and get his stripes, Khumba ventures into the leopard's lair. At the same time, Seko and the zebras journey to Phango's lair where they are joined by the springbok herd, the animals from Ying's National Park (all except the pangolin), the rock hyraxes, Skalk (who left his pack due to "creative differences"), and Nora (who was let out of the farm by Skalk).

While Khumba wanders the depths of the dark cave, his herd arrives at the base of the mountain, along with many of the other animals he has encountered along his journey. Within the cave, Khumba finds the watering hole and upon reflection of his mother's words and all of the interactions he has had, he realizes that diversity is essential for survival and that would can be one's difference can, in fact, be one's strength. As Phango closes in, he ends up chasing after Khumba. Khumba races to escape the leopard's clutches as the cave starts to collapse. Part of the cliff gives way which forms a water hole outside Phango's cave. The assembled animals watch the fight between Khumba and Phango, which results in both of them falling due to the collapsing cave. Phango falls off the cliff where he is killed by two large rocks falling on him, while Khumba falls into the water and his body washes up on the shores. As it starts to rain, everyone begins to mourn Khumba until he suddenly awakens from his apparent death. As Khumba gets up, Tombi notices the scratch marks that Phango left on his right side during the fight.

With Phango dead and the zebra herd now having a new home, Khumba celebrates with his herd, Mama V, Bradley, Skalk, Nora, the gemsbok herd, the springbok herd, the animals from Ying's National Park, and the rock hyraxes, who all now live together & engage in different activities around the waterfall.

Cast
 Jake T. Austin as Khumba, a plains zebra with half the stripes.
 Steve Buscemi as Skalk, an African wild dog.
 Loretta Devine as Mama V, a wildebeest.
 Laurence Fishburne as Seko, a plains zebra who is Khumba's father.
 Richard E. Grant as Bradley, a British accented common ostrich who was adopted by Mama V.
 AnnaSophia Robb as Tombi, a plains zebra who is Khumba's friend.
 Liam Neeson as Phango, a half-blind African leopard.
 Anika Noni Rose as Lungisa, a plains zebra who is Khumba's mother.
 Catherine Tate as Nora, an English accented Merino that resides at an abandoned farm
 Ben Vereen as Mkhulu, a plains zebra who is the leader of his herd.
 Charlie Adler as:
 Rock Hyrax Leader
 African Wild Dog #1
 Dee Bradley Baker as:
 Meerkat Father
 Rock Hyrax Chorus
 Jeff Bennett as:
 Riverine Rabbit, an Australian accented endangered riverine rabbit who befriend Khumba in Ying's Wildlife Park.
 Elder #3
 Mason Charles as Meerkat #2
 Kat Cressida as Cheerleader Plains Zebra #1
 Jennifer Cody as Fifi, a plains zebra who is Zuki's best friend Themba's girlfriend, Tombi's friend and cheerleader.
 Greg Ellis as
 Thabo, a plains zebra who is Tombi and Themba's father and Seko's best friend.
 Elder #1
 Roger L. Jackson as:
 The Black Eagle, an albino black eagle who directs Khumba to a water hole.
 Walkie Talkie Voice
 Juanita Jennings as Zuki, a plains zebra, who is Mkhulu's future mate and Fifi's best friend.
 Phil LaMarr as Elder #2
 Hope Levy as Cheerleader Plains Zebra #2
 Sindiwe Magona as Gemsbok Healer, who is leader of her herd who helped by Khumba to give her some water.
 Anele Matoto as Gemsbok #2
 Nhlanhla Mkwanazi as Gemsbok #1
 Bryce Papenbrook as Plains Zebra #1
 Khary Payton as:
 African Wild Dog #2
 Rock Hyrax Chorus
 Alexander Polinsky as Nigel, a plains zebra.
 Nik Rabinowitz as:
 Frikkie, a springbok.
 Percy, a springbok
 Joey Richter as Themba, a plains zebra, who is Tombi's brother, Thabo's son and Fifi's boyfriend.
 Sam Riegel as Jock, a plains zebra.
 Adrian Rhodes as Mantis, praying mantis who draw map for Khumba for magic water hole.
 Stephanie Sheh as Cheerleader Zebra #2
 Matthew Dylan Roberts as:
 Jannie, a springbok.
 Sakkie, a springbok
 Andre Robinson as Meerkat Baby
 Julianne Rose as Meerkat Girl
 Rob van Vuuren as:
 Bokkie, a springbok
 Captain, a springbok the leader of his herd.
 Koos, a springbok.

Jon Olson provides the vocal effects of additional animals.

Release
The film was released in cinemas in South Africa on 25 October 2013, and was released on DVD on 11 February 2014. The film also premiered at the TIFF on 8 September 2013.

Soundtrack

The original motion picture soundtrack for Khumba was written, composed, produced and orchestrated by Bruce Retief with additional music composed by Zwai Bala. Songs for the soundtrack were all written by Retief are performed by various artists, including Loyiso Bala, Heavenly Quartez, the Karoo Children's Choir, and Richard E. Grant. It was released on 1 December 2013 through labelzero.com, and is available on iTunes and Amazon.

Notes
 "The Real Me", with Retief, was additionally written by Loyiso Bala. It was programmed and produced by Ebrahim Mallum, with additional production from Retief, David Langemann, and Ashley Valentine.
 "Sulila" was produced by Retief.
 "Karoo Montage", performed by the Karoo Children's Choir, was produced by Retief, but the song was not put in the official soundtrack for several reasons.
 "Ostracized" was produced by Retief with additional brass orchestration handled by Lucien Lewin.

Reception
On Rotten Tomatoes, the film has an approval rating of 44% based on 18 reviews. On Metacritic, the film has a score of 40 out of 100 based on reviews from 6 critics, indicating "mixed or average reviews".

Accolades

References

External links

 
 

2013 films
2013 3D films
2013 computer-animated films
2010s adventure comedy films
South African animated films
Afrikaans-language films
Fictional zebras
Films about sheep
Best Animation Africa Movie Academy Award winners
Films set in Africa
Animated films about cats
Animated films about dogs
Animated films about birds
Fiction about familicide
3D animated films
2013 directorial debut films
2013 comedy films
South African adventure comedy films
2010s English-language films